Pentraeth railway station was situated on the Red Wharf Bay branch line between Holland Arms railway station and Benllech, the third station after the line branched from the main Anglesey Central Railway. Opening on 1 July 1908, a quarter of a mile out of the village it was one of the two largest stations on the line. On the Up (east) side of the line stood the  platform with several associated huts. Unlike the previous two stations Ceint and Rhyd-y-Saint this was staffed, albeit by a maximum of two people at any one time. There was also a small goods yard just south of the platform. It was also the nearest station for the town of Beaumaris.

The station closed in 1930, the line closed completely in 1950 the track was removed in 1953 and the station building removed. There is no evidence of the station or goods yard left as the site has houses built upon it.

References

Further reading

Disused railway stations in Anglesey
Railway stations in Great Britain opened in 1908
Railway stations in Great Britain closed in 1930
Pentraeth
Former London and North Western Railway stations
1908 establishments in Wales
1930 disestablishments in Wales